A Writer's Diary (Dnevnik pisatelya) is a collection of non-fiction and fictional writings by Fyodor Dostoevsky. Taken from pieces written for a periodical which he both founded and produced, it is normally published in two volumes: the first covering those articles published in the years 1873 and 1876, the second covering those published in the years 1877, 1880 and 1881.

Diary articles
The English titles of the following list of works are extracted from Kenneth Lantz's two-volume translations.

References

1876 books
1881 books
Books by Fyodor Dostoyevsky
Diaries